Orpington may refer to:
 Orpington, a town in Greater London
 Orpington railway station
 Orpington (UK Parliament constituency)
 Orpington F.C., a football club
 Orpington chicken, a breed of chicken
 Orpington Duck, a breed of duck